Mehedia may refer to:

 Mehdya, a town in Kénitra Province, Morocco
 Mahdia, a large coastal town in Tunisia
 Mechtat Mehedia, a village in Relizane Province, Algeria

See also
 Mehede, an urban area in Tierp Municipality, Uppsala County, Sweden, more commonly known as Mehedeby
 Mehedinţa, a commune in Romania now known as Podenii Noi